Ajay Ratra  (born 13 December 1981) is a former Indian  cricketer. He is a right-handed batsman and wicketkeeper. He made his ODI debut on Jan 19, 2002 against England.

Ratra was selected in 2000 for the first intake of the National Cricket Academy in Bangalore.
When Ratra made an innings of 115 not out in 2002 against the West Indies, he was the youngest wicketkeeper to make a century in Tests, and first Indian wicketkeeper to make an overseas century. After he was injured in 2002, he was replaced by Parthiv Patel, the youngest ever Test wicketkeeper. Ratra then fell behind Mahendra Singh Dhoni, Dinesh Karthik and Patel in the pecking order.

Ratra was part of the Indian Under-19 squad which won the Youth World Cup in 2000, and following training sessions with the National Cricket Academy he became one of six wicketkeepers that India would attempt to integrate into the squad in the space of 12 months. He played in the Syed Mushtaq Ali Trophy for the Goa.

In July 2015 Ratra announced his retirement from cricket. He played 99 first-class matches in which he scored 4029 runs at an average of 30.29 including eight hundreds and a double-century. He also played in 89 List A games in which scored 1381 runs at 22.63.

Career best performances 
as of 15 October 2010

References 

1981 births
Living people
India One Day International cricketers
India Test cricketers
Indian cricketers
People from Faridabad
Haryana cricketers
Goa cricketers
Himachal Pradesh cricketers
Tripura cricketers
North Zone cricketers
Indian cricket coaches
Cricketers from Haryana
Wicket-keepers